Karen J. Meech (born 1959) is an American planetary astronomer at the Institute for Astronomy (IfA) of the University of Hawaii.

Career 
Karen Meech specializes in planetary astronomy, in particular the study of distant comets and their relation to the early Solar System. She is also very active in professional-amateur collaboration and science teacher education and was the founder of the Towards Planetary Systems (TOPS) high-school teacher / student outreach program that helps educate science teachers in the Pacific islands. She received her PhD in Planetary Sciences in 1987 at the Massachusetts Institute of Technology, and a BS from Rice University in  Houston in 1981, and has received several awards in her career, including the Annie J. Cannon Award in Astronomy in 1988 and the American Astronomical Society's H. C. Urey Prize in 1994.

She was a co-investigator on the Deep Impact mission and current co-investigator on the NASA Discovery missions EPOXI and Stardust-NExT. For all three of these missions she has coordinated the world's Earth-based and space-based observing programs. She is the PI of the University of Hawaii NASA Astrobiology Institute lead team which focuses its research on "Water and Habitable Worlds".  She is currently the President of the International Astronomical Union Division III (Planetary Systems Science).

Honors 

List of discovered minor planets

References

External links 
 Karen Jean Meech homepage at Institute for Astronomy
 Talk of Karen Jean Meech at the Origins 2011 congress

1959 births
American women astronomers
Astrobiologists

Discoverers of minor planets
Living people
Massachusetts Institute of Technology School of Science alumni
Women planetary scientists
Planetary scientists
Recipients of the Annie J. Cannon Award in Astronomy
Rice University alumni
University of Hawaiʻi faculty
American women biologists
American women academics
21st-century American women